George Tait (1859 – 25 November 1882) was an English international footballer who played as a centre forward.

Career
Tait played for Birmingham Excelsior, and earned one cap for England on 26 February 1881. The match was a 1–0 loss to Wales.

He died in 1882 of typhoid.

References

1859 births
1882 deaths
English footballers
England international footballers
Birmingham Excelsior F.C. players
Association football forwards
Deaths from typhoid fever